Macomb High School, or MHS, is a public four-year high school located at 1525 S. Johnson Street in Macomb, Illinois, a city in McDonough County, Illinois, in the Midwestern United States. MHS is part of Macomb Community Unit School District 185, which also includes Macomb Junior High School, Edison Elementary School, Lincoln Elementary School, and MacArthur Early Childhood Center. The campus is located in Macomb, IL, and serves a mixed city and surrounding village and rural residential community. The school is within the Macomb micropolitan statistical area. The school is less than 3 miles from Western Illinois University.

Academics
Macomb High School is currently Fully Recognized by making adequate yearly progress and complying with state tests and standards. In 2009, 71% of students tested met or exceeded standards. MHS made Adequate Yearly Progress in 2009 on the Prairie State Achievement Examination, a state test that is part of the No Child Left Behind Act. The school's average high school graduation rate between 2000 and 2009 was 95%. School enrollment decreased from 623 to 565 (9%) in the period of 2000–2009.

In 2009, the faculty was 126 teachers, averaging 16.0 years of experience, and of whom 45% held an advanced degree. The average class size was 17.9. The student to faculty ratio was 15.5. The district's instructional expenditure per student was $5,578.

Athletics
Macomb High School competes in the Prairieland conference and is a member school in the Illinois High School Association. Its mascot is the Bombers. The school has 1 state championship on record in team athletics and activities.

Consolidations
Bardolph High School consolidated into Macomb High School in 1973.

History

Notable alumni
 Phil Bradley, Former MLB player (Seattle Mariners, Philadelphia Phillies, Baltimore Orioles, Chicago White Sox).
C. T. Vivian, civil rights leader and 2013 recipient of the Presidential Medal of Freedom.

References

 Macomb Community Unit School District 185
 Interactive Illinois Report Card
 Illinois High School Association

External links
 

Public high schools in Illinois
Schools in McDonough County, Illinois
Macomb, Illinois